Blacksmith is a music management company and a record label founded by Harlem born Corey Smyth and Talib Kweli of Black Star. 

Signees include Jean Grae, Strong Arm Steady, Vince Staples and Idle Warship. Kweli has stated he hopes to sign Camp Lo and had expressed interest in signing Rakim as well. 

Talib Kweli announced that there will be a 'BlackSmith TV' where people will get information about the label. 

The label was originally distributed through Warner Bros. Records but split in December 2008. Talib did confirm to AllHipHop.com that Warner Bros. would still distribute Reflection Eternal & Talib Kweli projects but not any other Blacksmith acts. It's now believed that the label has distribution through Element 9/Fontana with Strong Arm Steady latest project and Idle Warship's upcoming debut album said to have distribution through them. As of 2012 the label is defunct and was disbanded after Kweli's manager decided to focus the Blacksmith brand elsewhere rather than the label. Blacksmith management is currently home to artists such as Chad Hugo, and Vince Staples, among others.

Artists

Rappers/singers
Talib Kweli (2005–present)
Jean Grae (2005–present)
Anjulie
Vince Staples (2013–present)
Kilo Kish

Producers
Hi-Tek

Groups
Strong Arm Steady (2011–present)
Krondon
Mitchy Slick
Phil da Agony
Idle Warship
Talib Kweli
Res

Releases
2007: Talib Kweli & Madlib - Liberation
2007: Talib Kweli - Eardrum
2008: Jean Grae & 9th Wonder - Jeanius
2009: Idle Warship - Party Robot
2010: Reflection Eternal - Revolutions Per Minute
2011: Talib Kweli - Gutter Rainbows
2011: Strong Arm Steady - Arms & Hammers
2015: Vince Staples - Summertime '06
2017: Vince Staples - Big Fish Theory

See also 
 List of record labels
 Ambigram

References

External links
Official website
BlackSmith TV

Record labels established in 2005
Warner Music labels
Hip hop record labels
American record labels
Contemporary R&B record labels